Robert Murray Hawkes (18 October 1880 – 12 September 1945) was an English footballer who played for Luton Town, became their first international player, and competed in the 1908 Summer Olympics.

Playing career
Hawkes joined his local team Luton Town as an amateur in 1900, while working in the hat trade, which was prominent in the town. Such was his quality that he was a member of the English team that won the gold medal in the football tournament at the 1908 London Olympics. Meanwhile, he had become the captain of Luton Town.

He also made five appearances for the full England team, making his debut against Ireland on 16 February 1907. In 1908 he was a member of the England squad who toured Europe for the first time, making four appearances in the space of seven days against Austria (twice), Hungary and Bohemia; all four matches resulted in comfortable victories for England.

He was courted numerous times by clubs from the Football League, but always remained loyal to his roots at Luton, turning professional in 1911. He stayed with Luton until his retirement as a 39-year-old in 1920, when Luton rejoined the League themselves.

References

External links
 
 
 
 

1880 births
1945 deaths
English footballers
Southern Football League players
Luton Town F.C. players
Footballers at the 1908 Summer Olympics
Olympic footballers of Great Britain
English Olympic medallists
Olympic gold medallists for Great Britain
England international footballers
England amateur international footballers
Olympic medalists in football
Medalists at the 1908 Summer Olympics
Association football wingers